The Territorial Defense of the Republic of Slovenia ( (TO RS)), also known as the Territorial Defense of Slovenia (Slovenian: Teritorialna obramba Slovenije [TOS]), was the predecessor of the Slovenian Armed Forces. It was named after the Yugoslav Territorial Defense.

History 

After the 1968 Warsaw Pact invasion of Czechoslovakia, the Yugoslav leadership adopted the doctrine of General People's Defence and established the Territorial Defense. After the victory of democratic parties in the 1990 Slovenian parliamentary election, the central government in Belgrade ordered disarmament of TO Slovenia, a decision that was effectively ignored. Many weapons subsequently disappeared from supply depots and were later issued to the initial territorial defence units of the Republic of Slovenia.

Command 

TO headquarters were established on November 20, 1968. The early development of this military command was almost exclusively in the hands of Slovenian officers. In 1990, the Territorial Defence Republic Headquarters was violently occupied by the federal army. After this incident, Slovenia designated a new headquarters, who took command of the Slovenian Army. May 1991 marked the opening of the first military training centres in Ig, Ljubljana; and Pekre and Maribor. The first draftees were sworn in on June 2.

Organization 

The command language in TO was Slovenian, and this itself was organized in the form of an ancillary impact force to the JNA. After 1990 it was organized as a separate army, which was finally formed in the months before independence, in accordance with the Slovenian Constitution, which had already been adopted in 1990.

Equipment

Small arms
 Zastava M 70AB assault rifle
 Tokarev TT-33 handgun
 MG 34 machine gun
 Fagot anti-tank guided missile
 SKS carbine Yugoslav version M59/66
 Malyutka anti-tank guided missile
 Strela 2 MANPAD
 M80 Zolja anti-tank rocket launcher
 MG42 general-purpose machine gun Yugoslav version M53
 M48 bolt-action rifle including sniper version
 MGV-176 submachine gun
 M56 submachine gun Yugoslav version of MP40
 M60 recoilless gun
 M72 light machine gun
 M76 sniper rifle
 M79 Osa anti-tank rocket launcher
 M84 machine gun
 M49 submachine gun Yugoslav PPSh-41
 RB M57
 SAR 80 assault rifle
 3M6 Shmel anti-tank missile

Vehicles
 M-84 main battle tank
 M-36 tank destroyer
 T-54/55 main battle tank
 T-34/85 medium tank
 BTR-50 armoured personnel carrier PU version
 2S1 Gvozdika self-propelled howitzer
 BOV APC
 BRDM-2 armored car
 BVP M-80 IFV
 TAM 5000 military truck
 Puch G utility vehicle
 TAM-110 truck

Artillery
 M75 20mm AAG
 M-63 Plamen multiple rocket launcher
 BOV-3 SPAAG
 ZSU-57-2
 M53/59 Praga
 9K31 Strela-1 SAM

Aircraft

References

See also 
 Military of Slovenia
 Slovenian War of Independence

Ten-Day War
Military history of Slovenia
Contemporary history of Slovenia
Military units and formations established in 1968
Disbanded armies
Organizations based in Ljubljana